The J.E. Squiers House, also known as the Squiers Manor Bed and Breakfast, is a historic building located in Maquoketa, Iowa, United States.  The architectural and historic significance of this house is attributed to its being "a well-preserved example of late nineteenth century domestic architecture in Maquoketa's most prominent residential neighborhood and for its association with the life and career of James Emery Squiers, a prominent local businessman."  Built in 1882, the 2-story brick house features elements consistent with the Queen Anne and Stick styles.  It follows a central hall floor plan with two rectangular projecting bays, a three-sided bay window, a kitchen addition on the back, and a hipped roof with intersecting gable sections.

Squiers ran a dry goods business downtown, which he sold in 1885.  He was elected president of the First National Bank of Maquoketa, a position he held until two months before his death in 1911.  There was no mortgage to pay for the construction of this house, which attests to the Squiers' wealth.  The house was included as a contributing property in the West Pleasant Street Historic District in 1991, and it was individually listed on the National Register of Historic Places in 1995.

References

Houses completed in 1882
Queen Anne architecture in Iowa
Stick-Eastlake architecture in Iowa
Bed and breakfasts in Iowa
Houses in Maquoketa, Iowa
National Register of Historic Places in Jackson County, Iowa
Houses on the National Register of Historic Places in Iowa
Individually listed contributing properties to historic districts on the National Register in Iowa